The Humac tablet is an Old Slavic epigraph in Bosnian Cyrillic script  in the form of a stone tablet, believed to be variously dated to between the 10th and 12th century, being one of the oldest Bosnian preserved inscriptions. 

It is the oldest Cyrillic epigraph found in Bosnia and Herzegovina. It was found in the village of Humac in Bosnia and Herzegovina. It is kept at the museum of the Franciscan friary in Humac. It was first noted by a French diplomat at the Bosnia Vilayet. 

There is disagreement over the dating; Yugoslav epigrapher and historian Marko Vego dated it to the end of the 10th or the beginning of the 11th century; linguist Jovan Deretić to the 10th or 11th century; historian Dimitrije Bogdanović to the 12th century.

The text of the tablet tells about the act of raising a church dedicated to the Archangel Michael by Krsmir (also rendered Uskrsimir or Krešimir) and his wife Pavica. The tablet is quadrangle in shape (68x60x15 cm), and the inscription is carved in form of a quadrangle in Cyrillic script among which five Glagolitic letters (four E-like letters resembling Ⰵ and a Ⱅ letter alongside a conventional Cyrillic Т) occur.

Text

Transliteration and the interpretation of the text differs among Slavicists and paleographers.

References

Sources
 
 
 
 
 
 
 
 

History of the Serbo-Croatian language
Ljubuški
Texts of medieval Bosnia and Herzegovina
Bosnian Cyrillic texts